Vehicle registration plates of Armenia have black characters on a rectangular white background. They are composed of two or three numbers, two letters (smaller than the digits) in the middle, and two (or three) other numbers. At the left side is located the international code "AM" with an oval car plaque and, sometimes, the national flag.
Starting from 6 August 2014 a new design of license plates was implemented. The license plates have a national flag on the left side, a security hologram and a machinery readable Data Matrix Code.

Overview

Formerly, Armenia used to have license plates issued as part of the Soviet Union system. The republic had Cyrillic codes АД and АР.
Starting from 1996, after the independence of Armenia (due to the collapse of the Soviet Union), the system for the license plates was created. However, motorcycles and trailers were licensed under the former soviet format with the code АР. In 2010, finally, motorcycles and trailers started receiving Armenian format.

Style
From the beginning of the issuance of license plates, Armenian plates had the same style as Russia. Same fonts, and same differing font size for letters and digits were used. On the lower left hand side, the code AM was printed. In 2014, the style changed to the one used in Germany. The country's flag was added above AM on the top left hand side. The fonts were changed to FE-Schrift, and the letters and digits now have the same font size. In addition, a silver identifier band has been added on the right side of the flag and code.

Letters
Currently the following 26 letters are used: A, B, C, D, E, F, G, H, I, J, K, L, M, N, Օ, P, Q, R, Տ, T, Ս, V, W, X, Y, Z. The letters used on license plates have been added over a period of time. The following is the timeline.
 Originally four letters were used on the plates:
 Latin letter L, looking similar to Armenian letter Լ, translated as l
 Armenian letter Ս, translated as s, looking similar to Latin letter U
 Armenian letter Տ, translated as t, looking similar to Latin letter S
 Armenian letter Օ, translated as ô, looking similar to Latin letter O
 The Armenian letter Ո, translated as o, looking similar to lowercase Latin letter n, and the Latin letter P, looking similar to Armenian letter Ք, translated as k were used on special plates.
 Starting from December 2008, the letters Ո and P were being used on all plates.
 From November 2010, the Latin letters D, N, T, and V were allowed to be used, requiring an additional fee, with no Armenian counterpart. At the same time, the letter Ո fell out of disuse for not having a strong enough correlation with the Latin letter n.
 From May 2012, the Latin letters A, M, Q, and R were allowed to be used, requiring an additional fee, with no Armenian counterpart.
 Starting from July 2012, the letters D, N, T, and V, alongside the initial L, Օ, Տ, and Ս, have been used on a general basis.
 From October 2013, the Latin letters C, F, and Z were allowed to be used, requiring an additional fee, with no Armenian counterpart.
 Since the beginning of 2015, the Latin letters G and I have been used, however in the form of G G or I I, and only on vehicle's belonging to the Police or the Prosecutor's office.
 The letter X has been fully implemented since the first half of 2016.
 In 2017, the letters B and H were added.
 In 2018, the letter J was added.
 In 2019, the letters W, Y, K, and E were added.

The standard format for Armenian plates were either NN LL NNN or NNN LL NN, where N is a number and L being a letter.

The NN LL NNN format is meant for private vehicles while the other format is used for government-owned vehicles (such as the police cars). A two-row variation is provided with the first group of numbers and the letter group on the top row, and the remaining numbers on the second. The two-number group is supposedly the regional code.

Production of license plates in the mid-2000s was interrupted due to equipment failure.

Special combinations
Public vehicles have the format ### LL ##, where the first three digits are assigned in an increasing order, and the two letters and the last two digits are predefined. The following are the special combinations used on public vehicles.
 Constitutional Court: ### ՕՏ 01
 Presidential Administration: ### ՍՍ 01
 National Assembly: ### ՕՕ 01 to ### ՕՕ 11
 Government: ### FF 01, ### LL 03, ### ՏՏ 03, ### LL 50, ### LL 55, ### LL 60, ### LL 70, ### ՏՏ 60, ### VV 01
 Security Council: ### NN 01
 General Prosecutor's office: ### GG 01
 Police: ### ՈՍ 01 to ### ՈՍ 14, ### II ##
 Banks: ### ՏL 01 to ### ՏL 33
 The Court of Cassation: ### ՏՏ 01
 National Security Service: ### ՏՏ 02

Regional codes

Special plates 
 Motorcycle plates at first is almost essentially a double-row plate with the letter moved to the bottom. But soon after it was determined that this format is too cumbersome to carry, which brings in the compact plate , removing the space between the first group of numbers and the letters, leaving the remainder in the bottom row.
 Trailer plates are similar to double-row plates as well, but the letter count is cut down to 1, and most often the letter L, with more compact dimensions.

 Buses have black-on-yellow plates, similar to the discontinued public transport plate in Russia, in the NNNN L format. The letter S is used for city buses, while long-range coaches use L.
 
 Diplomatic plates are white-on-red, with the format NN L NNN LL. The first group of digits stands for the country code, and a letter D after it signifies a diplomat, while a T indicates a technician. The last two letters are always AM, Armenia's international code, while newer plates get the country code of ARM instead.

 UN offices carry white-on-blue plates in the format of UN NNN AM.
 
Military plates don't use Latin letters at all.

Artsakh
Armenian registration plates with region codes 22 and 90 are used in Artsakh (for example, "(AM) 90 SO 123").

See also
List of international vehicle registration codes
Transport in Armenia

Notes and references

External links

Armenian page at World License Plates
Information and pictures

Transport in Armenia
Armenia
Armenia transport-related lists
 Registration plates